Karl von Roques (7 May 1880 – 24 December 1949) was a German general and war criminal during the Second World War, who commanded the Army Group Rear Area behind Army Group South. Following the war, Roques was sentenced to 20 years imprisonment in the High Command Trial. He died in 1949 while serving his sentence.

Career
Karl von Roques was born in a German noble family of Huguenot descent. He entered the German Imperial Army in 1899. During the First World War, Roques served in staff roles in several divisions. By the end of the war he was promoted to major. After the armistice, Roques remained in the Reichswehr, serving in the Ministry of War, and then in staff and command roles in the army. Starting in 1934, Roques served as chief of staff and then the president of the Reichsluftschutzbund. In October 1938 he was recalled to active duty and in the Luftwaffe with the rank of lieutenant-general. In June 1939, Roques left the Luftwaffe with the rank of general.

During the Second World War, Roques served as an active officer in the Wehrmacht. In December 1939, he was given command of the new 143rd Infantry Division. From 15 March 1941 to October 1941, he was commander of the rear areas of Army Group South. On 1 July 1941, Roques was promoted to General der Infanterie.

As commander of the rear areas, Roques carried out extermination policies against the Soviet partisans, Slavic and Jewish population. In October 1941, Roques was transferred to the Führerreserve. In June 1942 he assumed command of the rear areas of Army Group South, and after the dividing of the army group in Army Group A and Army Group B, he commanded the rear areas of the former. On 1 January 1943, Roques was again placed in the Führerreserve and on 31 March 1943 he was again pensioned off. In August 1943 he went to Warsaw as a representative of the German Red Cross.

Trial and conviction
After the German capitulation, Roques was arrested and tried in the High Command Trial. He was sentenced to 20 years imprisonment. Moved for reasons of bad health from Landsberg Prison to a hospital in Nuremberg, he died there on 24 December 1949.

References

 
 Hasenclever, Jörn: Wehrmacht und Besatzungspolitik in der Sowjetunion: Die Befehlshaber der rückwärtigen Heeresgebiete 1941–1943. Schöningh, Paderborn 2010. .

External links
 

1880 births
1949 deaths
Holocaust perpetrators in Ukraine
German Army generals of World War II
Generals of Infantry (Wehrmacht)
Recipients of the Iron Cross (1914), 1st class
German people convicted of war crimes
German people convicted of crimes against humanity
People convicted by the United States Nuremberg Military Tribunals
Lieutenant generals of the Reichswehr
German Army personnel of World War I
Military personnel from Frankfurt
Nazis who died in prison custody
Prisoners who died in United States military detention